Nurton is a hamlet in the South Staffordshire District, in the English county of Staffordshire. Nearby settlements include the city of Wolverhampton and the villages of Perton and Pattingham.

Hamlets in Staffordshire
South Staffordshire District